is a 2020 Japanese drama film directed by Naomi Kawase. It was selected to be shown at the 2020 Cannes Film Festival. It is based on a 2015 novel by Mizuki Tsujimura. In June 2020, the Toronto International Film Festival announced that the film would be part of their 2020 festival. It was selected as the Japanese entry for the Best International Feature Film at the 93rd Academy Awards, but was not nominated.

Plot
Satoko (Hiromi Nagasaku) and Kiyokazu (Arata Iura) have a kindergarten-age son, Asato (Reo Sato), whom they adopted as a newborn. One day they receive a call from one of his teachers telling them that a boy at his school has fallen off the jungle gym and claims Asato pushed him which Asato denies. The boy's mother requests reimbursement for their medical expenses. Satoko worries that her son may have inherited bad genes from his birth parents. 

In a flashback to a few years earlier, Satoko and Kiyokazu decide to start a family and learn that Kiyokazu has aspermia. After a long, painful, and ultimately unsuccessful period of treatments, they decided to gave up and settle for a childless life until seeing a program on TV about Baby Baton, a nonprofit association that matches infertile couples with mothers who cannot or don't want to raise their biological children. Seeing this, Satoko and Kiyokazu realize that adoption could be a perfect alternative for them to build a normal family. 

When Satoko and Kiyokazu come to pick up the newborn Asato, they are asked if they want to meet his biological mother. They say yes, and are introduced to Hikari, a well-mannered young girl who cares deeply for her baby. Hikari gives them a letter to the baby, and says she is very sorry. 

Another flashback introduces Asato's biological mother, Hikari (Aju Makita), a fourteen-year-old junior high school student. Hikari falls in love with a male classmate, leading to a pure, mutual, and intense romance. They have sexual intercourse, and Hikari later finds out that she is pregnant; since she had not yet begun to menstruate, the discovery comes too late for her to have an abortion. Afraid of gossip and damaging Hikari's bright future prospects, her family decides to send her away to Baby Baton, which provides accommodations for expectant mothers and finds adoptive parents for their unwanted children. Hikari and the other expectant mothers, mostly young trafficked girls, find peace with each other while waiting to give birth.

In the present day, Satoko receives another phone call from the kindergarten teacher, revealing that the other boy lied about Asato pushing him and confessed that he jumped off the jungle gym himself. Satoko feels relieved, and the family plans a joyful visit to the zoo, but they are interrupted by a phone call from a woman claiming she is Asato's mother, and she wants her son back. Satoko and Kiyokazu reluctantly agree to meet Hikari who threatens to reveal their son is adopted unless they give her money. The couple reveal that their son's adoption is not a secret and based on what she has said and their one meeting of Hikari they do not believe that the woman they are talking to actually is Hikari. 

After returning from Baby Baton's facilities, Hikari came to feel like an outsider from her old life, and soon leaves home and returns to Baby Baton's facility, asking for a job and a place to stay. She learns that Baby Baton will be closing down after its final current resident delivers her baby. While working there, Hikari accidentally comes upon Baby Baton's records of adoptive parents, and finds the file about the adoptive parents of her son.

She moves closer to the city to be nearer her son and takes a job delivering newspapers. While working there she befriends a young girl her own age who reminds her of one of the pregnant women she met at Baby Baton. The two soon form a close friendship; however, her friend is in trouble with loan sharks and fakes Hikari's signature as a co-signer so she won't have to repay the loan. Hikari eventually comes up with the money and, broken hearted, finally reaches out to her son's parents. After hearing her son calling for his mother she apologizes and says she is not his mother and runs away.

Later on Sakoto is visited by the police who show her Hikari's name and confirm her identity. Ashamed of not having recognized Hikari, Sakoto manages to track her down and introduces her son to his birth mother.

Cast

Reception
The site's critical consensus reads, "True Mothers uses an intractable conflict to explore the bonds of parenthood with director/co-writer Naomi Kawase's usual sensitivity and grace."

Controversy
In April 2022, Shūkan Bunshun reported that Kawase physically assaulted a camera assistant while filming True Mothers in May 2019, leading cinematographer Yūta Tsukinaga and his team to resign mid-production. Kawase did not deny the allegation.

See also
 List of submissions to the 93rd Academy Awards for Best International Feature Film
 List of Japanese submissions for the Academy Award for Best International Feature Film

References

External links
 

2020 films
2020 drama films
Japanese drama films
2020s Japanese-language films
Films directed by Naomi Kawase
Films based on Japanese novels
Films about adoption